The Broadford Football Netball Club, nicknamed the Roos, is an Australian rules football and netball club and located 88 km north of Melbourne in the town of Broadford and is affiliated with the AFL Outer East.

History
Broadford was warned by the VCFL to clean up its act after ten players had fronted the tribunal during the year. One opposition player had his jaw broken in a behind the play incident. The Broadford coach, Paul Tilley, was suspended for two years because of his actions.

On 17 September 2019, at the third and final Special General meeting, 52 eligible members cast their vote opting for Outer East (47) as their home of choice over the Riddell District Football Netball League (5).

Football competitions
1908–1915 North East Football Association
1919-1919 Mernda Football Association
1921–1937 Waranga North East Football Association
1938–1940 Hume Highway Football Association
1941-1944 Broadford FC in recess due to World War Two
1945-1946 Hume Highway Football Association
1947–1976 Waranga North East Football Association
1977–1984 Riddell District Football League
1985–2008 Heathcote District Football League
2009–2019 Riddell District Football League
2020-present Outer East Football Netball League

Senior Football Premierships (17)
North Eastern Football Association
 1909, 1911, 
Mernda Football Association
1919 
Waranga North Eastern Football Association
1924, 1925, 1926, 1927, 1929, 1930, 1949, 1971, 1972, 1973, 1974
Riddell District Football League 
1981, 1984 - Division 2 
Heathcote District Football League
1996

Senior Football - Runners Up (8)
North Eastern Football Association 
1908, 1910, 1912
Waranga North Eastern Football Association 
1921, 1922, 1940, 1959
Riddell District Football League 
1977, 1978, 1979

Leading goalkickers
2001 Shane Moore 77
2002 Adrian Baker 94
2003 Adrian Baker 100
2009 Sam Taylor 43

VFL/AFL footballers
Alan Ezard (Essendon)
Jack Green (Collingwood)
Barry Hall (St Kilda, Sydney Swans and Western Bulldogs)
Richard Douglas  (Adelaide)

Bibliography
 History of Football in the Bendigo District by John Stoward -

References

External links
 Teamapp site
 Bradford Junior Facebook page

1890 establishments in Australia
Sports clubs established in 1890
Netball teams in Victoria (Australia)
Australian rules football clubs established in 1890
Australian rules football clubs in Victoria (Australia)
Shire of Mitchell